Picoliva ryalli is a species of sea snail, a marine gastropod mollusk in the family Volutidae, the volutes.

Description

Distribution
This marine species occurs off Ghana.

References

  Bouchet P. (1990). Systematics of Plicoliva, with description of a new subfamily (Gastropoda: Volutoidea). Archiv für Molluskenkunde. 120(1-3): 1-10

Volutidae
Gastropods described in 1989